The Gal Oya Dam (also known as Inginiyagala Dam) is an embankment dam in the Uva Province of Sri Lanka. The dam creates one of the largest reservoirs in the country, the Gal Oya Reservoir. Water from the reservoir is used primarily for irrigation in the Uva and Eastern provinces, in addition to powering a small hydroelectric power station.

Dam and reservoir 

The dam, built by Morrison-Knudsen company, creates the Gal Oya Reservoir.

Power station 
The power station consists of four units of (2.475MWx2 & 3.15MWx2), commissioned in 1952 unit 1,2 & 1962 unit 3,4.

See also 

 Electricity in Sri Lanka
 Gal Oya National Park
 List of dams and reservoirs in Sri Lanka
 List of power stations in Sri Lanka

References

External links 
 
 

Embankment dams
Dams in Sri Lanka
Hydroelectric power stations in Sri Lanka
Dams completed in 1953
Buildings and structures in Uva Province